Brachycrotaphus is a genus of grasshoppers in the subfamily Gomphocerinae (unassigned to any tribe), erected by Hermann August Krauss in 1877.  Species have been recorded from Africa, southern Europe and India (distribution may be incomplete).

Species 
The Orthoptera Species File lists:
 Brachycrotaphus brevis Uvarov, 1938
 Brachycrotaphus buettneri Karsch, 1896
 Brachycrotaphus elgonensis Sjöstedt, 1933
 Brachycrotaphus hoshiarpurensis Singh, 1978
 Brachycrotaphus indicus Uvarov, 1932
 Brachycrotaphus karschi Uvarov, 1926
 Brachycrotaphus kraussi Uvarov, 1932
 Brachycrotaphus latipes (Bolívar, 1905)
 Brachycrotaphus lloydi Uvarov, 1926
 Brachycrotaphus longiceps (Bolívar, 1902)
 Brachycrotaphus longicornis Jago, 1966
 Brachycrotaphus nigericus Chopard, 1947
 Brachycrotaphus rammei Uvarov, 1932
 Brachycrotaphus sjostedti Uvarov, 1932
 Brachycrotaphus tryxalicerus (Fischer, 1853) - type species (as Brachycrotaphus steindachneri Krauss)

References

External links

Orthoptera genera
Orthoptera of Africa
Orthoptera of Asia
Orthoptera of Europe
Gomphocerinae